South Caucasian can refer to:

 South Caucasian languages
 South Caucasian peoples, or Georgians
 South Caucasus, or Transcaucasia

See also
 Proto-South-Caucasian, the common ancestor of the Kartvelian languages